Gabriel the Hilandarian ( 1359–d. after 1412) was a Serbian monk-scribe. There is very little information available about Gabriel the Hilandarian, like most modest monks who lived in the 14th and early 15th century. It is known that he translated Olympiodorus the Younger's commentary on the Book of Job from Greek in 1411–12. The manuscript is now held at the State Historical Museum in Moscow.
 
In his younger days, Gabriel resided and worked at the Resava (Manasija) Monastery, built between 1407 and 1418 by Despot Stefan Lazarević. According to Constantine of Kostenets, Resava was built specifically as a centre for the followers of the Hesychasm movement, showing that Stefan held them in great esteem. Stefan endowed Resava generously with icons and books, and established a scriptorium and a translation school within the monastery. Old texts were corrected and copied and many were translated from Hebrew, Greek, Old Armenian, Old Georgian, Coptic, Syriac, and Old Latin. Among notable translators were Gabriel; Anonymous monk (Books of Kings, in 1411–12); the monk Jacob (Hexaemeron of John Chrysostom, first book, in 1425–26); Venedikt Crepović (Hexaemeron of John Chrysostom, second book, in 1425–26); and priest Panareta. During that time, translators made technical improvements in texts while they were being translated. Most of the scribes working in the scriptorium after completing their apprenticeship left for other monasteries in the then Serbian Empire.

See also
 Teodosije the Hilandarian (1246-1328), one of the most important Serbian writers in the Middle Ages
 Elder Grigorije (fl. 1310-1355), builder of Saint Archangels Monastery
 Antonije Bagaš (fl. 1356-1366), bought and restored the Agiou Pavlou monastery
 Lazar the Hilandarian (fl. 1404), the first known Serbian and Russian watchmaker
 Pachomius the Serb (fl. 1440s-1484), hagiographer of the Russian Church
 Miroslav Gospel
 Cyprian, Metropolitan of Kiev and All Rus'
 Gregory Tsamblak
 Isaija the Monk
 Elder Siluan
 Jovan the Serb of Kratovo
 Nicodemus of Tismana
 Dimitar of Kratovo
 Marko Pećki

References

Sources

14th-century Serbian writers
Medieval European scribes
15th-century Serbian writers
Medieval Serbian Orthodox clergy
Serbian monks
15th-century translators
People of the Serbian Despotate
14th-century Christian monks
15th-century Christian monks
People associated with Hilandar Monastery